Wankute is a village in Parner taluka in the Ahmednagar district of the state of Maharashtra, India.

Religion
The majority of the population in the village is Hindu.

Temples
 Charpatinath Baba Temple
 Tukai Temple
 Mahadev Temple (constructed in the period of Shivaji)
 Charpatinath Temple
 Nana maharaj Vankuteker Temple

Economy
The majority of the population has farming as their primary occupation.
NGO"s - 1) Prabodhini Sanstha. 2) Grambharti Mahila Mandal. 3) Sanwardhini Rural Development Trust.

See also
 Parner taluka
 Villages in Parner taluka

References 

Villages in Parner taluka
Villages in Ahmednagar district